Ruth Ndulu Maingi (born 22 May 1983), is a Kenyan actress. She is best known for the roles in the films 18 Hours, The Distant Boat and Midlife Crisis.

Personal life
Ruth was born on 22 May 1983 in Machakos, Kenya as the fourth child in the family of six siblings. She attended to Kathiani High School and Township Muslim Primary School in Machakos for her secondary and primary education respectively. She completed a diploma in insurance after high school.

Career
Ruth began her career as a dancer then she later shifted to performing arts to pursue a career and joined Kenya National Theatre Performing Arts School for two years. In 2007, she joined Kigezi Ndoto Musical Theatre Performances. Then in 2008, she moved to India and cast for Sauti Kimya and Githaa.

In 2011 she made her film debut with the film The Marshal of Finland and in the same year, she was selected for a lead role in the television series Lies that Bind, which made her television debut. In the series, she played the role 'Salome', the third wife and Richard Juma's true love, and the third wife. Then in 2013, she starred in popular Swahili drama Mama Duka with the titular role. For her role, she was later honoured at the 2014 Africa Magic Viewers Choice Awards.

She played a major role as a coach in the television serial The Team, with Media Focus on Africa produced by Dreamcatcher. In 2014, she starred in the two films: The Next East African Film Maker and Orphan. In 2018, she made Nollywood debut with the film Family First directed by Lancelot Imasuen.

Filmography

References

External links
 

Living people
1983 births
Kenyan television actresses
People from Machakos County
21st-century Kenyan actresses